William Byron, 4th Baron Byron (4 January 1669/70 – 8 August 1736) was an English nobleman, politician, peer, and Gentleman of the Bedchamber to Prince George of Denmark.

Early life
Byron was the only surviving son of William Byron, 3rd Baron Byron and Elizabeth Chaworth. He succeeded to the title of 4th Baron Byron in 1695 upon the death of his father.

Marriages and children

Lord Byron firstly married Lady Mary Egerton, daughter of John Egerton, 3rd Earl of Bridgewater and Lady Jane Powlett, in 1702/3, but they had no children.

Secondly, he married Lady Frances Wilhelmina Bentinck, daughter of Hans William Bentinck, 1st Earl of Portland and Anne Villiers, in 1706. All four of their children died in childhood or infancy:
 George Byron (1707–1719)
 William Byron (1709–1709)
 William Henry Byron (1710–1710)
 Frances Byron (1711–1724)

Frances Wilhelmina died on 31 March 1712. 

He married thirdly Frances Berkeley, daughter of William Berkeley, 4th Baron Berkeley of Stratton and Frances Temple, in 1720. They had six children:

Isabella Byron (1721–1795), wife of Henry Howard, 4th Earl of Carlisle
William Byron, 5th Baron Byron (1722–1798)
Vice-Admiral John Byron (1723–1786)
 Reverend Richard Byron (1724–1811)
 Charles Byron (1726–1731)
 George Byron (1730–1789)

Death 
Lord Byron died at Newstead Abbey on 8 August 1736, and was succeeded by his fourth (but oldest surviving) son William Byron, 5th Baron Byron.

His widow Frances remarried Sir Thomas Hay, Bart., of Alderston in 1741 and was buried on 21 September 1757 in Twickenham, Middlesex.

Citations

References 
William Byron, 4th Baron Byron, at thepeerage.com (accessed 26 November 2009)
Emily Brand, The Fall of the House of Byron (John Murray, 2020)

External links

1669 births
1736 deaths
William
17th-century English nobility
18th-century English nobility
Barons Byron